Sara M. Evans (born 1943) is a Regents Professor Emeritus in the history department at the University of Minnesota. She has also worked as the editor of Feminist Studies and a consulting editor of the Journal of American History. She received her B.A. from Duke University in 1966 and her M.A. from Duke University in 1968. She later received her PhD from the University of North Carolina at Chapel Hill in 1976 and began teaching at the University of Minnesota that year.

Her parents were a Methodist minister and a mother she describes as "a radical egalitarian in her bones."

Books

Her books include: Personal Politics: The Roots of Women's Liberation in the Civil Rights Movement and the New Left (1979), Born for Liberty: A History of American Women (1989), Wage Justice: Comparable Worth and the Paradox of Technocratic Reform (1989) (with Barbara J. Nelson), Free Spaces: Sources of Democratic Change in America, 2nd edition, (1992) (with Harry C. Boyte), Journeys That Opened Up the World: Women, Student Christian Movements, and Social Justice, 1955-1975 (2003), and Tidal Wave: How Women Changed America at Century's End (2003).

Awards

Her awards include: 
• CLA Dean's Medal, 1999 
• College of Liberal Arts Scholars of the College, University of Minnesota, 1991 - 1994 
• McKnight Humanities Scholar, University of Minnesota, 1996 - 1999 
• McKnight Distinguished University Professorship, beginning in 1997 
• College of Liberal Arts Dean's Medal, University of Minnesota, 1999 
• President's Outstanding Service Award, University of Minnesota, 1999 
• American Council of Learned Societies Fellowship, 2001 - 2002 
• Award for Outstanding Contributions to Postbaccalaureate, Graduate, and Professional Education, 2002 - 2003 
• Regents' Professorship, University of Minnesota, 2004

Papers
The Sara M. Evans Papers, 1959-2005, are held at the David M. Rubenstein Rare Book & Manuscript Library.

External links
with Sara M. Evans  by Stephen McKiernan, Binghamton University Libraries Center for the Study of the 1960s, August 16, 2010

References

20th-century American historians
21st-century American non-fiction writers
1943 births
Duke University alumni
Feminist historians
Living people
University of North Carolina at Chapel Hill alumni
Historians from Minnesota